The fourth season of the reality television series Love & Hip Hop: New York aired on VH1 from October 28, 2013 until February 10, 2014. The show was primarily filmed in New York City, New York. It was executively produced by Mona Scott-Young for Monami Entertainment, Toby Barraud and Stefan Springman for Eastern TV, and Shelly Tatro, Brad Abramson and Danielle Gelfand for VH1.

The series chronicles the lives of several women and men in the New York area, involved in hip hop music. It consists of 14 episodes, including a two-part reunion special hosted by Mo'Nique.

Production
On October 10, 2013, VH1 announced Love & Hip Hop would be returning for a fourth season on October 28, 2013. The season would premiere back to back with the second season of the spin-off series Chrissy & Mr. Jones. The season was preceded by 40 Greatest Love & Hip Hop Moments, a 2 hour clip show hosted by Mona Scott-Young. The special aired on October 24, 2013, and showcased the franchise's most "shocking, scandalous and dramatic Love & Hip Hop moments", featuring clips from the show's first three seasons, as well as the first two seasons of its spin-off Love & Hip Hop: Atlanta.

The cast was once again retooled, with only Yandy Smith, Erica Mena and Tahiry Jose returning from last season's main cast. They were joined by Peter Gunz' girlfriend Tara Wallace, Amina Buddafly, Saigon's baby mama Erica Jean and former Love & Hip Hop: Atlanta cast member K. Michelle. Peter Gunz joined the supporting cast, along with stripper Nya Lee, Saigon and Erica's girlfriend Cyn Santana. Former main cast member Rashidah Ali appeared as a guest star in several episodes.

The season was released on DVD on region 1 on January 25, 2015.

K. Michelle's purpose on the show was mainly served to set up her own spin-off series, as such, she appeared in infrequently and barely interacted with the rest of the cast. Her future co-stars on the show, Paris Phillips and Tracie Renee, appeared as guest stars. On October 15, 2014, VH1 officially announced K. Michelle: My Life, which premiered on November 3, 2014.

Synopsis

Rapper Peter Gunz finds himself in a twisted love triangle as he juggles his relationships with long-time girlfriend Tara and artist Amina. Tahiry struggles to trust Joe, even as he contemplates taking their relationship to the next level. Erica Mena has unfinished business with Rich, but finds herself falling in love with a woman. Yandy is trying to adjust to life with her man locked up awaiting sentencing. Rapper Saigon and his ex Erica Jean clash violently as they struggle to co-parent their new son. K. Michelle has come to New York for a fresh start.

Reception
The season's ratings improved significantly from last season's lackluster efforts, up 54% over last season's average and attracting an average of 3 million total viewers per episode.

Cast

Starring

 Yandy Smith (14 episodes)
 Tara Wallace (14 episodes)
 Erica Mena (14 episodes)
 Erica Jean (10 episodes)
 Tahiry Jose (13 episodes)
 Amina Buddafly (13 episodes)
 K. Michelle (8 episodes)
Note:

Credited onscreen as "Erica M.".
Credited onscreen as "Erica J.".

Also starring

 Peter Gunz (14 episodes)
 Rich Dollaz (14 episodes)
 Joe Budden (11 episodes)
 Nya Lee (6 episodes)
 Saigon (10 episodes)
 Cyn Santana (11 episodes)

Rashidah Ali returns in a guest role. Paris Phillips, Tahiry's sister Lexie Jose, Joe's mother Fay Southerland and Tahiry's sister Ginny Jose appear in several episodes as guest stars. Mendeecees Harris appears via phone call conversations with Yandy, as he was incarcerated during filming. The show also features minor appearances from notable figures within the hip hop industry and the cast's inner circle, including Cory Gunz, Stephen Marley, Yandy's father Ralph Smith, Yandy's artist J. Dinero, Wyclef Jean, Amina's sister Sophie Schmahl, Erica Mena's friend Albee Yours, Rich's mother Jewel Escobar and Nick Cannon.

Episodes

Webisodes

Check Yourself
Love & Hip Hop New York: Check Yourself, which features the cast's reactions to each episode, was released weekly with every episode on digital platforms.

Bonus scenes
Deleted scenes from the season's episodes were released weekly as bonus content on VH1's official website.

Music
Several cast members had their music featured on the show and released singles to coincide with the airing of the episodes.

References

External links

2013 American television seasons
2014 American television seasons
Love & Hip Hop